Ruggero Maccari (28 June 1919 – 8 May 1989) was an Italian screenwriter.

Specially known by his collaboration with film director and screenwriter Ettore Scola. He wrote Commedia all'italiana films such as The Easy Life, Brutti sporchi e cattivi, or Adua e le compagne.

Awards 
He was nominated to the Academy Award for Dino Risi's Profumo di donna.
 
He won a David di Donatello for Ettore Scola's La famiglia; and he was a 4 time Nastro d'Argento winner for  La famiglia, Scola's Passione d'amore and A Special Day, and Antonio Pietrangeli's  Io la conoscevo bene.

Selected filmography
 Eleven Men and a Ball (1948)
 The Transporter (1950)
 Rome-Paris-Rome (1951)
 The Steamship Owner (1951)
 The Passaguai Family (1951)
 I, Hamlet (1952)
 The Dream of Zorro (1952)
 Sardinian Vendetta (1952)
 The Passaguai Family Gets Rich (1952)
 The Piano Tuner Has Arrived (1952)
 Beauties in Capri (1952)
 The Doctor of the Mad (1954)
 Toto Seeks Peace (1954)
 It Happened at the Police Station (1954)
 Tripoli, Beautiful Land of Love (1954)
 The Two Friends (1955)
 Red and Black (1955)
 Count Max (1957)

External links

20th-century Italian screenwriters
Italian male screenwriters
Writers from Rome
1919 births
1989 deaths
David di Donatello winners
Ciak d'oro winners
20th-century Italian male writers